State Route 232 is primarily a north and south highway located completely in Layton, Davis County, Utah that begins at SR-126 and runs to the south entrance of Hill Air Force Base.

Route description
From its southern terminus in Layton, SR-232 heads north-east and intersects with I-15. The road then veers north. Near the northern terminus the road intersects with SR-193 and ends at the south entrance of Hill Air Force Base.

History
The road from SR-1 (now SR-126) in Layton north to SR-193 at Hill Air Force Base was built in 1940 with federal aid and numbered SR-232 in 1941. A short realignment was made at the south end in 1967, when I-15 was built parallel to SR-126, and in 1994 the definition was changed to allow the route to extend north past SR-193 to the base entrance.

Major intersections

References

External links

232
 232
Streets in Utah